Vincent Earl (born 11 June 1944) is an English singer, comedian and actor most famous for his portrayal of the character Ron Dixon in the soap opera Brookside, a role which he played from 1990 until the show's demise in 2003.

He was involved in the Merseybeat scene of the 1960s as singer with the Vince Earl and the Talismen, and Vince Earl & the Attractions. He also played in the band "Rory Storm and the Hurricanes" and The Wirral band The Zero's who played in the Majestic nightclub Conway street Birkenhead in the early 1960s. He is a stand up comedian who appeared on the Granada Television show The Comedians before landing the Brookside part. As Frank in the film No Surrender his performance was both menacing and hilarious at the same time. He also appeared in Boys from the Blackstuff.

In 2001, while still appearing in Brookside, Earl appeared on Lily Savage's Blankety Blank. In November 2007, Earl returned to the set of Brookside in West Derby, Liverpool for an interview with ITV Local News to celebrate 25 years since the show started on Channel 4. He showed reporters around the Close, showing them his character's house, and the infamous patio where Trevor Jordache was found. Michael Starke, who played Sinbad Sweeney, also featured in the interview from the set of his new soap home at Coronation Street.

He is a supporter of Liverpool F.C.

In 2010, he was hospitalised with Goodpasture's syndrome which resulted in the need for regular dialysis. In the summer of 2012, he successfully underwent a kidney transplant.

References

1944 births
English male comedians
English male soap opera actors
People from Birkenhead
Living people
Rory Storm and the Hurricanes members